Karma Chhoden (born 13 June 1966), is an archer who represented Bhutan internationally.

Chhoden competed for Bhutan at the 1984 Summer Olympics held in Los Angeles in the individual event where she finished 46th.

References

External links
 

1966 births
Living people
Olympic archers of Bhutan
Archers at the 1984 Summer Olympics
Bhutanese female archers
Place of birth missing (living people)